Tinsley House may refer to:

Tinsley House Immigration Removal Centre, a UK IRC in Gatwick
Tinsley House (museum), a living history museum, part of the Museum of the Rockies